Aguas Calientes (Jujuy) is a town and municipality in Jujuy Province in Argentina.

Geography
Aguas Calientes is located at 567 meters above sea level and 60 km south of San Salvador de Jujuy.

Climate

Geology
Aguas Calientes (Jujuy) has a sedimentary Paleozoic "base", appearing through tecto-erosive vents. They form the core of the mountains, intermittently overlying a Meso-Cenozoic sedimentary cover. This sedimentary complex evolved in successive cycles, mostly marine. "Yacoraite formation" minerals are made up of dolomitic, travertine and argonite limestones.

References

Populated places in Jujuy Province